Théoden is a fictional character in J. R. R. Tolkien's fantasy novel, The Lord of the Rings. The King of Rohan and Lord of the Mark or of the Riddermark, names used by the Rohirrim for their land, he appears as a supporting character in The Two Towers and The Return of the King. When first introduced, Théoden is weak with age and sorrow and the machinations of his top advisor, Gríma Wormtongue, and he does nothing as his kingdom is crumbling. Once roused by the wizard Gandalf, however, he becomes an instrumental ally in the war against Saruman and Sauron.

Scholars have compared Théoden to Theodoric, King of the Visigoths, and Théoden's death in the Battle of the Pelennor Fields to Theodoric's in the Battle of the Catalaunian Fields. He has been contrasted, too, with another protagonist in The Lord of the Rings, Denethor Steward of Gondor; where Denethor is harsh, Théoden is open and welcoming.

Fictional biography

The Two Towers

Théoden is introduced in The Two Towers, the second volume of The Lord of the Rings, as King of Rohan. By this point Théoden had grown weak with age, and was largely controlled by his chief advisor Gríma Wormtongue, who was secretly in the employ of the corrupt wizard Saruman. One of the last Hunt for the Ring manuscripts says Wormtongue has "great influence over the king", who is "enthralled by his counsel".
In Unfinished Tales, it is further implied that the failure of the king's health was "...induced or increased by subtle poisons, administered by Gríma". As Théoden sat powerless, Rohan was troubled by Orcs and Dunlendings, who operated under the will of Saruman, ruling from Isengard.

When Gandalf and Aragorn, along with Legolas and Gimli, appeared before him in The Two Towers, Théoden initially rebuffed the wizard's advice to oppose Saruman. When Gandalf revealed Wormtongue for what he was, however, Théoden returned to his senses. He restored his nephew, took up his sword Herugrim, and in spite of his age, led the Riders of Rohan to victory in the Battle of Helm's Deep. He then visited Isengard, saw that it had been destroyed by the Ents of Fangorn forest, and, speaking with the wizard Saruman in the tower of Orthanc, saw Gandalf break Saruman's staff.

The Return of the King

In The Return of the King, Théoden led the Rohirrim to the aid of Gondor at the Battle of the Pelennor Fields. In that battle, he routed the Harad cavalry, personally killing their chieftain. He challenged the Witch-king of Angmar, the leader of the Nazgûl, but was mortally wounded when his own horse Snowmane fell upon him. He was avenged by his niece Éowyn and a hobbit, Merry Brandybuck, who had ridden to war together in secret; together, they destroyed the witch-king. In his last moments, Théoden bade farewell to Merry and Éowyn.

Théoden's body lay in Minas Tirith until it was buried in Rohan after the defeat of Sauron. He was the last of the Second Line of the kings, judging from direct descent from Eorl the Young.

Etymology

Théoden is transliterated directly from the Old English þēoden, "king, prince", in turn from þeod, "a people, a nation". As with other descriptive names in his legendarium, Tolkien uses this name to create the impression that the text is historical. Tolkien mapped the Westron or Common Speech to modern English; the ancestral language of the Rohirrim in his system of invented languages would therefore map to Old English.

Analysis

According to the scholar Elizabeth Solopova, the character of Théoden was inspired by the concept of Northern courage in Norse mythology, particularly in the Beowulf epos: the protagonist of a story shows perseverance while knowing that he is going to be defeated and killed. This is reflected in Théoden's decision to ride against Sauron's far superior army in the Battle of the Pelennor Fields. There are also repeated references by Tolkien to a historic account of the Battle of the Catalaunian Fields by the 6th century historian Jordanes. Both battles take place between civilizations of the "East" (Huns) and "West" (Romans and their allies, Visigoths), and like Jordanes, Tolkien describes his battle as one of legendary fame that lasted for several generations. Another apparent similarity is the death of King Theodoric I of the Visigoths on the Catalaunian Fields and that of Théoden on the Pelennor. Jordanes reports that Theodoric was thrown off by his horse and trampled to death by his own men who charged forward. Théoden also rallies his men shortly before he falls and is crushed by his horse. And like Theodoric, Théoden is carried from the battlefield with his knights weeping and singing for him while the battle still goes on.

  

Tolkien scholars including Jane Chance contrast Théoden with another "Germanic king", Denethor, the last of the Ruling Stewards of Gondor. In Chance's view, Théoden represents good, Denethor evil; she notes that their names are almost anagrams, and that where Théoden welcomes the hobbit Merry Brandybuck into his service with loving friendship, Denethor accepts Merry's friend, Pippin Took with a harsh contract of fealty. Hilary Wynne, in The J. R. R. Tolkien Encyclopedia, writes further that where both Théoden and Denethor had despaired, Théoden, his courage "renewed" by Gandalf, went to a hopeless-seeming battle at Helm's Deep and won, and then again on the Pelennor Fields where "his attack saved the city of Minas Tirith from sack and destruction".

Numerous scholars have admired Tolkien's simile of Théoden riding into his final battle "like a god of old, even as Oromë the Great in the battle of the Valar when the world was young". Among them, Steve Walker calls it "almost epic in its amplitude", inviting the reader's imagination by alluding "to unseen complexity", a whole mythology of Middle-earth under the visible text. Fleming Rutledge calls it imitative of the language of myth and saga, and an echo of the messianic prophecy in Malachi 4:1-3. Jason Fisher compares the passage, which links the blowing of all the horns of the host of Rohan, Oromë, dawn, and the Rohirrim, with Beowulfs pairing of aer daege ("before day", i.e. "dawn") and Hygelaces horn ond byman ("Hygelac's horn and trumpet") in lines 2941-2944. Peter Kreeft writes that "it is hard not to feel your heart leap with joy at Théoden's transformation into a warrior", however difficult people find the old Roman view that it is sweet to die for your country, dulce et decorum est pro patria mori.

The Tolkien scholar Tom Shippey writes that Rohan is directly calqued on Anglo-Saxon England, taking many features from Beowulf, and not only in personal names, place-names, and language. He states that Tolkien's lament for Théoden equally closely echoes the dirge that ends the Old English poem Beowulf. Théoden's warriors and gate-guards behave like Beowulf characters, making their own minds up rather than just saying "I was only obeying orders".
Théoden lives by a theory of Northern courage, and dies through Denethor's despair.

In adaptations

In the 1981 BBC Radio 4 version of The Lord of the Rings, Théoden's death is described in song rather than dramatized conventionally; he is voiced by Jack May. In Ralph Bakshi's 1978 animated version of The Lord of the Rings, the voice of Théoden was provided by Philip Stone. Théoden also appears in Rankin/Bass's attempt to complete the story left unfinished by Bakshi in their television adaptation of The Return of the King, though he speaks little, and is voiced by Don Messick. His death is narrated by Gandalf (voiced by John Huston); in the animation, he is killed by a cloud, not by the Witch-king.

Théoden is an important character in Peter Jackson's Lord of the Rings film trilogy. The character, played by Bernard Hill, first appears in The Two Towers (2002). However, unlike in the books, the Lord of the Mark is actually possessed and prematurely aged by Saruman (Christopher Lee). Gandalf (Ian McKellen) releases him from the spell, instantly restoring him to his true age, after which Théoden banishes Gríma Wormtongue (Brad Dourif) from Edoras.

Notes

References

Primary
This list identifies each item's location in Tolkien's writings.

Secondary

Sources

 
 
 
 
 
 

Middle-earth Rohirrim
Middle-earth rulers
Fictional kings
The Lord of the Rings characters
Literary characters introduced in 1954
Fictional swordfighters

de:Figuren in Tolkiens Welt#Théoden